Bill Brasky, full name William Robert Brasky, is an unseen character who is the subject of a series of sketches on the television sketch comedy program Saturday Night Live. The sketches were a recurring feature on the program between 1996 and 1998, and were written by cast member Will Ferrell and then-head writer Adam McKay. The sketch made a reappearance on the show on December 7, 2013, during which Ferrell made a guest appearance, as the episode was guest-hosted by his Anchorman 2 co-star Paul Rudd.

Format 
The format of the sketches resembles the improv game "Two Describe a Third." Three or four friends (known as the "Bill Brasky Buddies") gather in a public place to drink Scotch, smoke cigars, and loudly reminisce about their mutual acquaintance Bill Brasky. The Brasky Buddies are all apparently businessmen who worked with Brasky. They all have red cheeks, red noses, and big white teeth. They appear to be coming from a business conference, and are already very drunk.

The discussions begin with an agreement that "Bill Brasky is a son of a bitch," at which point the Buddies proceed to tell tall tales of Brasky's superhuman feats, usually focused on his huge size, virility, celebrity connections, amazing tolerance for drugs and alcohol, and reckless disregard for human life. If their stories are to be believed, Brasky is enormously tall and heavy, superhumanly tough, can eat anything, has numerous affairs, and has killed and maimed many people. All of the salesmen have been his victim at one time or another, but they are all celebrated with the same gusto. At regular intervals, they raise their glasses to toast him, shouting "To Bill Brasky!"

Typically, the three cycle through the same genres of comment four or five times. The first buddy will begin a long anecdote about Brasky, interrupted by the second drunkenly blurting out something embarrassing (e.g. "I'm wearing a diaper"). The buddies then exchange several shorter claims about Brasky. The cycle will then repeat, starting with the second Brasky Buddy, getting more outrageous each time around. At some point another man, usually Tim Meadows, will interject with "Are you guys talking about Bill Brasky? I know Bill Brasky!" and be welcomed into the group.

Some sketches end with Brasky's appearance via a forced perspective shot that makes him look like a giant.

Sketches 
 "Airport" (January 20, 1996) Bill Brasky Buddies: Alec Baldwin, Will Ferrell (as Hank), David Koechner, Mark McKinney (as Russ), Tim Meadows
 "Holiday Inn" (March 16, 1996) Bill Brasky Buddies: John Goodman (as Ted), Will Ferrell (as Hank), David Koechner, Mark McKinney (as Russ), Tim Meadows
 "Funeral" (February 22, 1997) Bill Brasky Buddies: Alec Baldwin, Will Ferrell (as Hank), Mark McKinney, Tim Meadows.  With Ana Gasteyer as a Mourner.
 Took place at "McKay Funeral Home", a reference to the sketch's writer, Adam McKay.
 "Little League" (May 10, 1997) Bill Brasky Buddies: John  Goodman, Will Ferrell (as Hank), Mark McKinney (as Russ), Tim Meadows.  With Ana Gasteyer as a Parent.
 The original live broadcast of this sketch was severely truncated, with the last 2–3 minutes of the sketch being cut off. Shortly before the closing shot with the forced-perspective shot of Brasky, the three Brasky Buddies can be seen struggling through their lines, presumably due to lack of cue cards. After the sketch ended, there was an impromptu 45-second shot of the SNL band to fill time, before the last commercial break and goodnights. It is unknown why this sketch was cut short, but it is likely because there was a time discrepancy. There was only about 45 seconds in the goodnights, which would explain why the last few minutes of the sketch were abruptly cut off. In reruns, this edition of the sketch was replaced with the full-length dress rehearsal version.
 "A.A. Meeting" (unaired) (October 25, 1997) Bill Brasky Buddies: Will Ferrell (as Hank), Chris Farley (as Frank), Norm Macdonald. With Ana Gasteyer and Tim Meadows as A.A. members.
 During the rehearsal, Farley's large fake teeth fall out twice and he later stumbles over his lines. This sketch was cut after dress rehearsal and never made it into the live show. However, fragments of the unaired dress rehearsal sketch were later released on Saturday Night Live: The Best of Chris Farley and the full sketch was made available on Yahoo! Screen. But then Yahoo! Screen was taken down and the full skit is once again missing.
 "Bull & Bear" (December 12, 1998) Bill Brasky Buddies: Alec Baldwin, John Goodman (as Ted), Will Ferrell (as Hank).  With Ana Gasteyer and Andy Murphy as patrons.
 "Chuck E. Cheese's" (December 7, 2013) Bill Brasky Buddies: Will Ferrell (as Hank), David Koechner, Paul Rudd, Taran Killam, Kenan Thompson. With Cecily Strong as a waitress.

In addition to the Bill Brasky sketches, a sketch that followed a very similar format called "Mr. Willoughby" appeared on the January 14, 2006 episode of SNL. Framed as a trailer for a movie based on a lost Jane Austen novel of the same title, the sketch featured Rachel Dratch, Tina Fey and host Scarlett Johansson as a trio of Victorian sisters rhapsodizing about one Mr. Willoughby, "the most eligible bachelor in all of Upper Cornholeshire." Like the Brasky Buddies' stories, the sisters' descriptions of Willoughby steadily grow more and more bizarre, and they recount even the most repugnant facts ("His teeth are like sharp pieces of corn!") with an attitude of lovestruck awe. At several points the three sisters sigh, "Mr. Willoughby!" in unison, much like the Brasky Buddies' periodic toasts of "To Bill Brasky!"

See also 
 Chuck Norris facts
 The Most Interesting Man in the World
 Six Degrees of Kevin Bacon
 Recurring Saturday Night Live characters and sketches

References

Fictional salespeople
Saturday Night Live sketches
Saturday Night Live characters
Television characters introduced in 1996
Saturday Night Live in the 1990s